Archie Parvin Eves (February 27, 1876 – October 18, 1958) was an American football coach. He served as the fourth head football coach at Buchtel College—now known as the University of Akron—helming the team for one season in 1899 and compiling a record of 2–1. Eves later worked as a chemist for the Gillette Rubber Company in Wisconsin.

Head coaching record

References

1876 births
1958 deaths
Akron Zips football coaches
University of Akron alumni
Sportspeople from Akron, Ohio